The 1970–71 Cleveland Cavaliers season was the inaugural season of NBA basketball in Cleveland, Ohio. The Cavaliers finished the season with a 15–67 record in their first season, finishing last in the Central Division and Eastern Conference. John Johnson was named an All-Star, the first in franchise history.

Key Dates:

Offseason

Expansion Draft
 As an expansion (first year) franchise, the Cavaliers chose 11 players from other NBA teams in the 'expansion draft.'

Free agents

Trades

Draft picks

Roster

Regular season

Season standings

Record vs. opponents

Game log

October
Record: 0–9 ; Home: 0–2 ; Road: 0–7

November
Record: 1–17 ; Home: 0–8 ; Road: 1–9

December
Record: 4–13 ; Home: 4–6 ; Road: 0–7

January
Record: 5–9 ; Home: 4–4 ; Road: 0–5 ; Neutral: 1–0:

February
Record: 2–12 ; Home: 1–5 ; Road: 0–7 ; Neutral: 1–0

March
Record: 3–7 ; Home: 2–5 ; Road: 1–2

|-style="background:#fcc;"
| 10 || November 1, 1970 || Atlanta
| L 107–131
|
|
|
| Cleveland Arena3,533
| 0–10

|-style="background:#fcc;"
| 44 || December 31, 1970 || @ Atlanta
| L 85–119
|
|
|
| Alexander Memorial Coliseum5,429
| 5–39

|-style="background:#fcc;"
| 57 || January 29, 1971 || @ Atlanta
| L 111–119
|
|
|
| Alexander Memorial Coliseum7,192
| 9–48

|-style="background:#fcc;"
| 76 || March 12, 1971 || Atlanta
| L 107–119
|
|
|
| Cleveland Arena8,341
| 13–63

References

 Cleveland Cavaliers on Database Basketball
 Cleveland Cavaliers on Basketball Reference

Cleveland
Cleveland Cavaliers seasons
Cleveland
Cleveland